Sohrevardi street (formerly known as Farah street) is one of Tehran's streets.
This street begins from Resalat Expressway and ends at Bahar Shiraz street.

References

Streets in Tehran